Kishtwari or Kashtwari is a northern Indo-Aryan language closely related to the Kashmiri language, with strong influences from neighboring Western Pahari varieties, spoken in the Kishtwar district of Jammu and Kashmir, India.

Classification 
Kishtwari has historically been classified as a dialect of Kashmiri by scholars such as George Abraham Grierson, and is partially intelligible with Kashmiri, but Kishtwari speakers maintain a separate identity from Kashmiri people, culturally identifying more closely with neighboring Pahari populations of Paddar, Doda-Bhadarwah and the rest of the Chenab Valley. Linguists like Siddheshwar Varma consider Kishtwari an intermediate between Western Pahari languages and Kashmiri. If considered a divergent dialect of Kashmiri, Kishtwari is one of two Kashmiri varieties spoken outside of the Kashmir Valley (the other being Poguli, which is even more distinct and not intelligible with either Kashmiri or Kishtwari). Kishtwari is also tonal, like neighbouring languages such as Dogri and Punjabi.

Overview

Grierson, in his Linguistic Survey of India, classified Kishtwari as a highly divergent variety of Kashmiri that had been profoundly influenced by neighbouring Punjabi and Western Pahari languages. Grierson noted that Kishtwari is more conservative in certain aspects than other Kashmiri dialects, as evidenced by the retention of subject pronoun thu, in addition to the present participle an, features that have disappeared in Standard Kashmiri. A wordlist and preliminary grammatical sketch of Kishtwari were compiled in The Languages of the Northern Himalayas. 

The 1911 Census of India recorded 7,464 speakers of Kishtwari.

Script 
Grierson remarks that an idiosyncratic variant of Takri is used to write the Kishtwari language; as well as observing that there does not appear to be standard spelling nor a consistent orthography.

References 

Kashmiri language
Kishtwar district